The 2004 All-Ireland Senior Hurling Championship Final was a hurling match played at Croke Park on 12 September 2004 to determine the winners of the 2004 All-Ireland Senior Hurling Championship, the 118th season of the All-Ireland Senior Hurling Championship, a tournament organised by the Gaelic Athletic Association for the champions of the four provinces of Ireland. The final was contested by Kilkenny of Leinster and Cork of Munster, with Cork winning by 0–17 to 0–9.

The game
The game got off to a flying start as Kilkenny missed three early opportunities, including Eddie Brennan putting a great goal chance wide within seconds of the throw in. Cork went ahead through a Joe Deane free from 20 metres. Cork had a couple of refereeing decisions in their favour to go with that and give them the slight advantage through the first ten minutes.

Henry Shefflin got Kilkenny back on track with a point from out on the left and Cha Fitzpatrick followed up soon after with another well taken score as Cork's short puck out strategy misfired. Joe Deane was again reliable from the placed ball at short range, pointing after a James Ryall foul. Deane was also dangerous in open play with the crossbar denying him a goal, while Ben O'Connor's smashed the follow up into the side netting. Kilkenny got the next score with Martin Comerford putting Kilkenny back into the lead and went further ahead after Shefflin pointed a free.

Cork's Brian Murphy received attention with double vision brought on by migraine, which forced him out of the game. Kilkenny got back on top after that stoppage with a Martin Comerford point. Another Deane free ended a nine-minute scoreless sequence for Cork. An exchange of wides followed as Kilkenny continued to foul at around fifty metres from their goal. Ben O'Connor got his first point as a result of one foul. Brian Corcoran got Cork's first score from play to put them within a point. Shefflin pointed the next long free for Kilkenny, replacing D. J. Carey who had been wayward. Jerry O'Connor replied for Cork.

Cork had a great start after the interval and Niall McCarthy refused what looked a good goal chance within seconds of the restart, taking a simple point instead. An exchange of points followed. Niall McCarthy's purple patch continued as he scored the point of the game from a puck out, fielding well before turning, running and striking to score. Kieran Murphy made up for a missed Ben O'Connor free by pointing a simple chance. Niall McCarthy put Cork two in front before Kieran Murphy won another free 45 metres out with Ben O'Connor taking the chance this time.

Kilkenny's response was immediate. Shefflin showed terrific skill to get a shot on target on the volley from Carey's hand pass but his effort was saved by Donal Óg Cusack in the Cork goal and from his clearance James Ryall fouled Deane on the forty, yielding another free chance. Deane pointed the free to put Cork in a commanding position. Subsequent frees from Ben O'Connor and Deane as well as a Tom Kenny point put Cork well clear. Cork conceded a '65 to Kilkenny which they defended successfully before Brian Corcoran putt the final nail in Kilkenny's coffin, grabbing a fine point from a tight angle just before the final whistle.

Cork's All-Ireland victory was their first since 1999. The win gave them their 29th All-Ireland title over all and put them as outright leaders on the all-time roll of honour.

Match details

Statistics

MATCH RULES
70 minutes.
Replay if scores level.
Five substitutes allowed.

All-Ireland Senior Hurling Championship Final
All-Ireland Senior Hurling Championship Final, 2004
All-Ireland Senior Hurling Championship Final
All-Ireland Senior Hurling Championship Finals
Cork county hurling team matches
Kilkenny GAA matches